Possessor is a 2020 science fiction psychological horror film written and directed by Brandon Cronenberg. It stars Andrea Riseborough and Christopher Abbott, with Rossif Sutherland, Tuppence Middleton, Sean Bean, and Jennifer Jason Leigh in supporting roles. Riseborough portrays an assassin who performs her assignments through possessing the bodies of other individuals, but finds herself fighting to control the body of her current host (Abbott).

The film had its world premiere at the Sundance Film Festival on January 25, 2020, and was released in the United States and Canada on October 2, 2020, by Neon and Elevation Pictures, while Signature Entertainment distributed the United Kingdom release on November 27, 2020. It received positive reviews, with praise for its originality and Riseborough and Abbott's performances.

Plot
In an alternate 2008, Tasya Vos is an assassin who takes control of others' bodies to carry out her hits. Through an implant installed in the unwitting host's brain, Vos can use a special machine to insert her consciousness into their minds. She returns to her own body by forcing the host to commit suicide at the end of each job.

Due to the amount of time she spends imitating other people, Vos struggles with increasing detachment from her own identity and cannot fully separate her work from her interactions with her husband, Michael, and son, Ira. She "practices" assuming her normal persona the same way she practices impersonating her hosts. Thoughts of violence haunt her during ordinary domestic life, such as when putting Ira to bed and having sex with Michael.

Vos' handler, retired assassin Girder, is critical of her desire to remain connected to her family and expresses the belief that Vos would be a better killer without personal attachments. In a debriefing session meant to reconnect her with her real identity, Vos sorts through a series of objects associated with personal memories and pauses on a butterfly that she pinned and framed as a child. She tells Girder she feels guilty for killing it.

Despite her fragile mental state and fatigue with her work, Vos agrees to perform a major hit on wealthy CEO John Parse and his daughter, Ava, by possessing Ava's fiancé, Colin Tate. The hit is only a partial success as Ava dies, but not Parse. Vos attempts to flee the scene by forcing Tate to shoot himself, but discovers she cannot make him pull the trigger.

Tate instead stabs himself in the skull in an act of rebellion. This damages the implant, and Vos discovers she cannot leave Tate's body or overpower his will. Tate, regaining control, does not know why he killed his girlfriend or why he has begun to experience false, fragmented memories of another person's — Vos' — life.

The traumatized and disoriented Tate flees from the crime scene to his friend Reeta's apartment. He kills Reeta while struggling with dissociative memories of the hit on Parse and Ava. Eddie, another employee from Vos's company, arrives at the apartment to help Vos regain control and complete Tate's suicide. The attempt fails. Vos is still unable to make Tate kill himself. Instead, he becomes aware of her presence inside his body. His consciousness overpowers hers in a psychic confrontation, giving him access to memories of her husband, child and home. He kills Eddie during their internal battle.

Tate then goes to Vos' home and holds her husband at gunpoint, demanding to know what she did to him. Vos appears and goads Tate into killing Michael so that she can be freed from her personal attachments. When Michael knocks the gun from Tate's hand, Tate kills him with a meat cleaver. Moments later, Ira stabs Tate in the throat, finally killing him. Tate uses his last moments to fatally shoot Ira, though it is clear that Vos is in control.

Vos returns to her own body and discovers Girder had taken control of Ira to end her struggle with Tate. With Ira and Michael both dead, she is now free of all human attachments, just like Girder wanted.

In another debriefing, Vos sorts through the same personal objects from the beginning of the film. She handles the butterfly again, but does not express any guilt for killing it. Girder smiles and replies, "Very good."

Cast
 Andrea Riseborough as Tasya Vos
 Christopher Abbott as Colin Tate
 Jennifer Jason Leigh as Girder
 Sean Bean as John Parse
 Rossif Sutherland as Michael Vos
 Tuppence Middleton as Ava Parse
 Kaniehtiio Horn as Reeta
 Raoul Bhaneja as Eddie
 Gage Graham-Arbuthnot as Ira Vos
 Rachael Crawford as Dr. Melis
 Hrant Alianak as Lead Technician
 Gabrielle Graham as Holly Bergman

Production
In May 2018, it was announced Andrea Riseborough and Christopher Abbott had joined the cast of the film, with Brandon Cronenberg directing from a screenplay he wrote. Fraser Ash, Niv Fichman, Kevin Krikst, and Andrew Starke will produce the film under their Rhombus Media and Rook Films banners. Telefilm Canada will produce the film, while Elevation Pictures will distribute in Canada. In February 2019, Jennifer Jason Leigh, Stacy Martin and Sean Bean joined the cast of the film. In May 2019, Tuppence Middleton joined the cast of the film, replacing Martin.

Filming
Principal photography began on April 9, 2019.

Release
In November 2018, Well Go USA Entertainment acquired distribution rights to the film. The film later had its world premiere at the Sundance Film Festival on January 25, 2020. Shortly after, Neon acquired distribution rights to the film, with Well Go USA only handling the film's home media release. It was released in the United States and Canada on October 2, 2020. The film was released in the United Kingdom on November 27, 2020, by Signature Entertainment.

Reception
The website's consensus reads, "Further refining his provocative vision, writer-director Brandon Cronenberg uses Possessors potentially over-the-top premise as a delivery mechanism for stylishly disturbing thrills." On Metacritic, the film has a weighted average score of 72 out of 100, based on 23 critics, indicating "generally favorable reviews".

The film received a positive review by David Sims in The Atlantic, who wrote: "Cronenberg isn't just looking to provoke with blood and guts—like all good dystopian fiction, Possessor offers disturbing and timely observations about the world we already live in." It was a New York Times Critic's Pick, with Glenn Kenny praising the film's formal sophistication.

The film's opening sequence was singled out for praise, particularly Gabrielle Graham's performance as Holly in the sequence. David Ehrlich from IndieWire called it "a coldly compelling prologue"; and Wendy Ide from Screen Daily agreed: "In a memorable cameo role in the film’s opening, Gabrielle Graham also makes an impact."

Meagan Navarro of Bloody Disgusting gave the film a score of four-and-a-half out of five, writing: "Like dad David Cronenberg, Brandon Cronenberg has a unique way of testing the boundaries of comfort and exploring the human mind and body in squeamish fashion." John DeFore of The Hollywood Reporter praised the film's direction, visuals, as well as its performances, and special effects. Rob Hunter of Film School Rejects gave the film a positive review, writing: "While Possessor retains his family's love of body horror and morally misused electronics it also manages an engrossing pace, engaging characters, unrelentingly brutal violence, erect penises, a must-own Halloween mask, a mean-spirited Sean Bean, one hell of an ending, and more.... All of it, though, is fantastically and cruelly unforgettable." Chris Evangelista of Slashfilm gave the film ten out of ten, writing: "Bathed in blood and gore, and unrelentingly aggressive, Brandon Cronenberg‘s Possessor is unlike anything you’ve ever seen before. It is a singular work – one so ghastly, so unique, and so brutal that it will awe some and disgust others."

JoBlo.com's Chris Bumbray gave the film a score of eight out of ten, stating that the film "recalls many of his father David Cronenberg's previous works", Bunbray further praised Abbott and Riseborough's performances, as well as similar praise towards the film's visual style. David Ehrlich from IndieWire also gave the film a grade of "B−", praising Cronenberg's direction as well as the film's cinematography, visuals, and performances, while also stating it did not fully realize its potential.

Accolades
Possessor won the awards for Best Feature Length Film and Best Direction at the Sitges Film Festival in 2020. It was also given the Grand Prize at the 2021 Gérardmer Film Festival, where Jim Williams won for Original Score. The film received three nominations at the inaugural Critics' Choice Super Awards in the Science Fiction/Fantasy category, for Best Movie, Best Actor, and Best Actress. It was named to the Toronto International Film Festival's year-end Canada's Top Ten list for feature films.

References

External links
 
 
 
 
 Possessor at Library and Archives Canada

2020 films
2020 science fiction horror films
2020s British films
2020s Canadian films
2020s English-language films
2020s psychological horror films
British body horror films
British psychological horror films
British science fiction horror films
Canadian body horror films
Canadian psychological horror films
Canadian science fiction horror films
Cyberpunk films
English-language Canadian films
Films about assassinations
Films about consciousness transfer
Films directed by Brandon Cronenberg
Neon (distributor) films